Virginia's 19th congressional district is an obsolete congressional district in Virginia.  It was created in 1793 after the 1790 U.S. Census and was eliminated in 1843 after the 1840 U.S. Census. Its last Congressman was George W. Summers.

Boundaries
The congressional district existed for fifty years. During that time it moved around the Commonwealth, from the east of Virginia to the west (since 1863 in the state of West Virginia). Although all the counties in the district after particular boundary changes have not been confirmed, it is possible to give a general indication of the part of the state involved. This is based on notes in Dubin's book about incomplete returns.

1793–1803: The district included Westmoreland and Northumberland counties in the Northern Neck peninsula of eastern Virginia.

1803–1813: The district number was re-allocated to the south-east of the state, bordering on North Carolina, including Isle of Wight, Southampton, Surry and Sussex counties.

1813–1823: The district moved north-west of its previous incarnation to include Dinwiddie and Nottoway counties.

1823–1833: The district moved west to overlap the post 1863-boundary between Virginia and West Virginia, in what at the time was the middle of the Commonwealth. The territory in the district included Bath County, Virginia and what subsequently became Pocahontas County, West Virginia.

1833–1843: The district extended to the western edge of the pre-1863 Virginia. It included the now West Virginia counties of Cabell, Fayette, Logan and Nicholas.

List of members representing the district

Election results
When complete vote totals are not available, incomplete vote totals are in brackets. All Virginia general congressional elections, for Virginia, in the period covered by this article, were held after the start of the legal term of the Congress. The congressional term started on March 4 in odd numbered years. The Virginia election was usually held in March or April. The House mostly convened for the first time during one of the last three months of the year.

 Note (1793): Returns from Westmoreland County only. Party label for Heath taken from the Wikipedia article on the 3rd Congress, as Dubin gives no party labels for this election.

 Note (1795): Incomplete data.

 Note (1797): Returns from Westmoreland County only.

References
 United States Congressional Elections, 1788–1997: The Official Results, by Michael J. Dubin (McFarland and Company, 1998)

 Congressional Biographical Directory of the United States 1774–present

19
Former congressional districts of the United States
Constituencies established in 1793
Constituencies disestablished in 1843
1793 establishments in Virginia
1843 disestablishments in Virginia